The Oman Cricket Board, known as Oman Cricket for marketing purposes, is the official governing body of the sport of cricket in Oman. Its current headquarters are located in Ruwi, Oman. The Oman Cricket Board is Oman's representative at the International Cricket Council, gaining affiliate membership in 2000 and associate membership in 2014. It is also a member of the Asian Cricket Council.

In 2021, Oman was awarded six first-round matches in the 2021 ICC Men's T20 World Cup, with the remainder to be hosted in the United Arab Emirates. The tournament was originally scheduled to be hosted in India, and the Board of Control for Cricket in India (BCCI) retained hosting rights, working collaboratively with Oman Cricket and the Emirates Cricket Board (ECB) to stage the tournament. Oman Cricket Chairman Pankaj Khimji  Appointed As Vice President Of Asian Cricket Council. The Oman Cricket chairman [[Pankaj Khimji]] was appointed as the vice-president of the Asian Cricket Council from 2022-23.

See also
 Cricket in Oman
 Oman national cricket team
 Oman women's national cricket team

References

External links
Official website
Cricinfo-Oman

Cricket administration
Sports governing bodies in Oman